The European School Copenhagen (ESC)  is an Accredited European School situated in the heart of the Carlsberg district of Copenhagen, Denmark. It caters to nursery, primary and secondary level students, leading to the European Baccalaureate as its secondary leaving qualification. The ESC is affiliated to the Sankt Annæ Gymnasium, a local Danish school, and is overseen by a joint management board of the two schools.

History
The plans for the school were presented by Copenhagen Municipality, Realdania, Novo Nordisk Fonden, Nordea-fonden and Industriens Fond. Welcoming its first students in 2014, the school was initially based out of a temporary location at the South Harbour School.

A competition for the design of the new school was won by BAM Danmark, Vilhelm Lauritzen Arkitekter, Nord Arkitekter and EKJ consulting engineers. The school moved into its new building on 25 October 2018 and it was officially inaugurated on 20 November 2018.

See also
Accredited European School
European Baccalaureate
European Schools

References

External links
 Official website

Accredited European Schools
Sankt Annæ Gymnasium
International schools in Denmark
Primary schools in Copenhagen
Secondary schools in Copenhagen
Educational institutions established in 2014
2014 establishments in Denmark
School buildings completed in 2018